The 1987 KFK competitions in Ukraine were part of the 1987 Soviet KFK competitions that were conducted in the Soviet Union. It was 23rd season of the KFK in Ukraine since its introduction in 1964. The winner eventually qualified to the 1988 Soviet Second League.

Group stage

Group 1

Group 2

Group 3

Group 4

Group 5

Group 6

Final
The final was taking place in Zakarpattia Oblast (Khust and Vynohradiv).

See also
 1987 Football Cup of Ukrainian SSR among KFK

References

External links
 Group 4: sports.ru
 ukr-footbal.org.ua

Ukrainian Football Amateur League seasons
Amateur